Turkmenistan has competed in seven Games of the Olympiad, first appearing in 1996. They have never competed in the Olympic Winter Games and are the only post-Soviet state not to have competed in them. Turkmenistan is also the northernmost country in the world to have never competed in the Winter Olympics. Turkmen athletes previously competed with the Soviet Union team and, in 1992, as part of the Unified Team.

On July 27, 2021, Turkmenistan won its first ever medal as an independent nation at the 2020 Summer Olympics in Tokyo, with Polina Guryeva winning the silver medal in the women's 59 kg event in Weightlifting.

Other Turkmens who won Olympic medals include late seven-time world champion Marat Nyýazow (representing USSR during the Olympics in Rome in 1960) and Daniyar İsmayilov (currently representing Turkey). Notably, in 1992, 3-time European weightlifting champion Altymyrat Orazdurdyýew was a member of the Unified Team at the Olympic Games in Barcelona. However, head coach Vasily Alexeev did not allow him to compete.

Turkmenistan's capital, Ashgabat, has an Olympic Park, which, in 2017, hosted Asian Olympic Council’s Asian Indoor & Martial Arts games that included participation from Australia and wider Oceania. It also hosted the 2018 World Weightlifting Championships.

The National Olympic Committee of Turkmenistan was formed in 1990.

Medal tables

Medals by Summer Games

Medals by Summer sport

List of medalists

See also
 List of flag bearers for Turkmenistan at the Olympics
 Turkmenistan at the Paralympics

References

External links
 
 
 
 

 
Olympics